David George Ashworth (2 June 1867  – 1947) was an English football referee and manager.

He became the first manager of Oldham Athletic in 1906, spending eight successful years there before moving on to manage Stockport County in 1914 and staying with them through the First World War.

In 1920 he was appointed manager of Liverpool and in his first season in charge he guided them to their second successive season in 4th place, eight points behind the Champions Burnley.

The following season, 1921/22, Ashworth led Liverpool to their third League Championship. The team were well on their way to a second successive Championship the following season, when in February 1923 Ashworth left the table-topping side to return to Oldham, then at the bottom of the league. Oldham ended the season relegated, while Liverpool only won one of their last seven games, but still won the Championship by six points.

Ashworth remained at Oldham for just over a year before moving to Manchester City, but he resigned in 1925 as the club struggled towards relegation. He next tried his hand in management with a brief spell with Walsall between 1926 and 1927.

Managerial career

Career honours
Liverpool
 Football League First Division: 1921–22

See also 
 List of English football championship winning managers

References

External links
 
 Manager profile at LFChistory.net

1867 births
1947 deaths
Liverpool F.C. managers
Oldham Athletic A.F.C. managers
Manchester City F.C. managers
Walsall F.C. managers
Stockport County F.C. managers
People from Blackpool
Date of death missing
English football managers